The Weightlifting Competition  at the 1992 Summer Olympics in Barcelona consisted of ten weight classes, for men only.

Medal summary

Medal table

References

Sources
 
Official Olympic Report 

 
Olympic
1992 Summer Olympics events
1992